Sunshine Jocelyn Sian Anderson (born June 7, 1974) is an American R&B and soul singer and songwriter.

Early life

Beginnings
Anderson was born in Winston-Salem, North Carolina, and later moved to Charlotte. Wallace Sellars, a friend of a producer/Soulife A&R Vice President, Mike City, heard Anderson singing on her way to the cafeteria of North Carolina Central University (where she earned a BS in criminal justice) and introduced the two. From there, Anderson was managed by Macy Gray during the recording of her first album.

1999–2002: Your Woman
In 1999, Anderson signed with Atlantic Records. Anderson released her debut album, Your Woman in April 2001. The album debuted at No. 8 on Billboard'''s Hot 200 and No. 2 on Top R&B charts. The lead single, "Heard It All Before," (released May 21, 2001) peaked at No. 18 on the Billboard Hot 100 and at No. 3 on the R&B charts. The follow-up single "Lunch or Dinner," peaked at No. 54 on R&B charts. The album was certified gold later that year.

2004–2007: Sunshine at Midnight
In August 2004, Anderson signed to Mathew Knowles' new record label Music World Entertainment. In 2006, her first single for her new label, "Something I Wanna Give You" was released and peaked at No. 80 on Billboard R&B charts. A video of the song was shot in Los Angeles by director Gil Green.

On January 23, 2007, Anderson released her second album, Sunshine at Midnight. The album debuted and peaked at No. 86 on the Billboard 200 and No. 16 on the R&B charts. In addition to the release of the album, Anderson toured with singer Brian McKnight. Later that year, the follow-up singles "Force of Nature" (#75 R&B) and "Wear The Crown" were released.

2010–present: The Sun Shines Again
In September 2010, Anderson announced on her Twitter that her new single "Lie to Kick It" was released to radio. Her third studio album, The Sun Shines Again'' was released November 2, 2010, on Verve Forecast Records.

Discography

Studio albums

Singles

References

African-American women singer-songwriters
American contemporary R&B singers
Living people
American neo soul singers
Musicians from Winston-Salem, North Carolina
1974 births
Singer-songwriters from North Carolina
21st-century American women singers
21st-century American singers
Atlantic Records artists
Verve Forecast Records artists
21st-century African-American women singers
20th-century African-American people
20th-century African-American women